The Anneliese Brost Musikforum Ruhr is a music hall for classical music. It is located in Bochum, Germany. It was opened on 28 October 2016. The building consists of three parts: an auditorium holding up to 1026 people, the entrance area in the middle (which is in the desacralized church of St. Marien), and a second hall which holds an audience of up to 250 people. The big hall is designed for symphonic concerts, the smaller one for chamber music.

The hall is the home location of the Bochumer Symphoniker orchestra. The decision to build the Anneliese Brost Musikforum Ruhr was made with considerable backing from the American composer, Steven Sloane.

References

External links

Bochumer Symphoniker Orchestra; homepage
Stiftung Symphonie
Bochumer Symphoniker

Concert halls in Germany
Bochum
Event venues established in 2016
Tourist attractions in North Rhine-Westphalia
Music venues in Germany
Music venues completed in 2016
2016 establishments in Germany
Culture of North Rhine-Westphalia
Buildings and structures in Bochum